Thomas Archer (1668–1743) was an English Baroque architect, whose work is somewhat overshadowed by that of his 
contemporaries Sir John Vanbrugh and Nicholas Hawksmoor. His buildings are important as the only ones by an English Baroque architect to show evidence of study of contemporary continental, namely Italian, architecture.

Life
Archer spent his youth at Umberslade Hall in Tanworth-in-Arden in  Warwickshire, the youngest son of Thomas Archer, a country gentleman, Parliamentary Colonel and Member of Parliament, and Ann Leigh, daughter of the London haberdasher, Richard  Leigh. The exact date of Archer's birth is unknown, but can be inferred from the two documentary sources that mention his age. One is an entry in the Oxford University register recording his matriculation at Trinity College on 12 June 1686, aged 17; the other, his epitaph, survives in the parish church of Hale, Hampshire. If these records are accurate, he must have been born between 12 June 1668 and 22 May 1669. Thomas is the only one of the Archer children not to have his birth recorded in the Tamworth-in-Arden parish register, which suggests he may  have been born elsewhere. He attended Trinity College, Oxford, from which he matriculated on 12 June 1686. After leaving university, he went on a Grand Tour, spending four years abroad and was influenced by the work of Bernini and Borromini.

Churches
Among Archer's churches was St John Evangelist, Westminster, suggestive of Hawksmoor's baroque influence.  Its four towers were originally built to stabilise subsidence.  Historians believed that was more likely than following Sir John Vanbrgh's style.  Built in 1750, St Paul's, Deptford, sweeping semi-circular porticos were not copied for a century until Smirke's magnificent church at St Mary's, Bryanston Square that dominated the street.  At St Philip's, Birmingham, now Birmingham Cathedral there was a strong sense of the Italianate Lombardic influences of High Baroque style of churches: ornate, high ceilings, with cupola and dome.  External to St Philips is the roof balustrade quite unusual in English church architecture.  St John's and St Paul's were both built for the Commission for Building Fifty New Churches. John Summerson said  these two buildings "represent the most advanced Baroque style ever attempted in England".  According to the minutes of the Commissioners, Archer also "improved" Hawksmoor's designs for St Alfege's at Greenwich, although the nature of the improvements, or whether they were implemented, is unknown.

At Hale,  Hampshire, he remodelled St Mary's Church, which also contains his memorial, carved by Sir Henry Cheere to Archer's own design.

Secular works
Archer's secular works included Roehampton House in Surrey, Welford Park in Berkshire, and the Cascade House and the west front and broadly bowed pilastered north front at Chatsworth House. In 1709–11 Archer designed a Baroque garden pavilion for Henry Grey, 1st Duke of Kent at Wrest Park, Silsoe, Bedfordshire. After 1712 Archer designed Hurstbourne Priors in Hampshire for John Wallop (later Earl of Portsmouth).

He was a founding governor of the Foundling Hospital in London in 1739, but was not involved in the construction of the resulting building, completed c. 1750. The architect for that project was Theodore Jacobsen.

Documented works 
Chatsworth House, North front, Derbyshire, c. 1705
Heythrop Hall, Oxfordshire, c. 1705
St Philip's, Birmingham, 1708–1715
Garden pavilion, Wrest Park, Bedfordshire, 1709–1711
Roehampton House, Surrey, 1712
Cliveden House, Service pavilions and the quadrant colonnades, Buckinghamshire
Hurstbourne Priors, Hampshire, 1712
St John’s, Smith Square, London, 1713–1728
St. Paul's, Deptford, 1712–1730
Hale Park, Hampshire, 1715
St Mary’s Church, additions, Hale, Hampshire, 1717
Harcourt House, Cavendish Square, London, 1722
Hale Park, the house Archer designed for himself.

Attributed works
Welford Park, remodelling of house, Berkshire, 1700
Chicheley Hall, Buckinghamshire, c. 1703
Parish church, chancel, Chicheley, 1708
Addiscombe House, Croydon, Surrey, c. 1703
Monmouth House, Soho Square, London, 1703
Russell House, King Street, Covent Garden, London, c. 1704
Cascade House, Chatsworth House, Derbyshire, 1705
Hill House, Cain Hill, Wrest Park, Bedfordshire, c. 1710, demolished
Bramham Park, Yorkshire, c. 1710
Kingston Maurward, Dorset, 1717–1720
Marlow Place, Buckinghamshire, 1720
Chettle House, Dorset, c. 1730
Monument to Susannah Thomas, Hampton Church, Middlesex, c. 1731
Archer Memorial, St Mary’s Church, Hale, Hampshire
Thomas Archer (his father) monument, St Mary Magdalene Church,  Tanworth-in-Arden, Warwickshire

Gallery

Notes

References

Further reading
Andor Gomme, ‘Archer, Thomas (1668/9–1743)’, Oxford Dictionary of  National Biography, (Oxford University Press, September 2004; online edn, January 2008) , accessed  8 November 2008.
 Whiffen, Marcus:Thomas Archer: Architect of the English Baroque, 
 Hennessey & Ingalls, Santa Monica 1973,

External links

Thomas Archer

1668 births
1743 deaths
Alumni of Trinity College, Oxford
18th-century English architects
English Baroque architects
English ecclesiastical architects
People from Tanworth-in-Arden
Architects of cathedrals
Thomas Archer buildings
Architects from Warwickshire